Faerlea is a genus of acoels belonging to the family Isodiametridae.

The species of this genus are found in Europe.

Species:

Faerlea antora 
Faerlea echinocardii 
Faerlea fragilis 
Faerlea glomerata

References

Acoelomorphs